Roger Daniel Cortés Guevara (born 23 October 2000) is a Costa Rican footballer who plays as a midfielder for AD Sarchí.

Career

Club career
Cortés is a product of UCR and got his professional debut for the club on 15 April 2018 against Alajuelense in the Liga FPD. This was his first and last game in the 2017–18 season. In the following season, he made two official appearances, before leaving the club at the end of 2018.

On 2 January 2020, Cortés joined Municipal Grecia. His contract was extended in July 2020 after one league appearance for the club.

In the summer 2021, Cortés moved to Aserrí FC.

References

External links
 

Living people
2000 births
Association football midfielders
Costa Rican footballers
Liga FPD players
C.F. Universidad de Costa Rica footballers
Municipal Grecia players
People from San José, Costa Rica